There have been several nuclear and radiation accidents involving fatalities, including nuclear power plant accidents, nuclear submarine accidents, and radiotherapy incidents.

List of accidents

Events with disputed fatality counts

Chernobyl disaster

Estimates of the total number of deaths potentially resulting from the Chernobyl disaster vary enormously: A UNSCEAR report proposes 45 total confirmed deaths from the accident . This number includes 2 non-radiation related fatalities from the accident itself, 28 fatalities from radiation doses in the immediate following months and 15 fatalities due to thyroid cancer likely caused by iodine-131 contamination; it does not include 19 additional individuals initially diagnosed with acute radiation syndrome who had also died , but who are not believed to have died due to radiation doses. The World Health Organization (WHO) suggested in 2006 that cancer deaths could reach 4,000 among the 600,000 most heavily exposed people, a group which includes emergency workers, nearby residents, and evacuees, but excludes residents of low-contaminated areas. A 2006 report, commissioned by the  anti nuclear German political party The Greens and sponsored by the Altner Combecher Foundation, predicted 30,000 to 60,000 cancer deaths as a result of worldwide Chernobyl fallout by assuming a linear no-threshold model for very low doses. A Greenpeace report puts this figure at 200,000 or more. A disputed Russian publication, Chernobyl, concludes that 985,000 premature deaths occurred worldwide between 1986 and 2004 as a result of radioactive contamination from Chernobyl.

Kyshtym disaster
The Kyshtym disaster, which occurred at Mayak in Russia on 29 September 1957, was rated as a level 6 on the International Nuclear Event Scale, the third most severe incident after Chernobyl and Fukushima. Because of the intense secrecy surrounding Mayak, it is difficult to estimate the death toll of Kyshtym. One book claims that "in 1992, a study conducted by the Institute of Biophysics at the former Soviet Health Ministry in Chelyabinsk found that 8,015 people had died within the preceding 32 years as a result of the accident." By contrast, only 6,000 death certificates have been found for residents of the Tech riverside between 1950 and 1982 from all causes of death, though perhaps the Soviet study considered a larger geographic area affected by the airborne plume. The most commonly quoted estimate is 200 deaths due to cancer, but the origin of this number is not clear. More recent epidemiological studies suggest that around 49 to 55 cancer deaths among riverside residents can be associated to radiation exposure. This would include the effects of all radioactive releases into the river, 98% of which happened long before the 1957 accident, but it would not include the effects of the airborne plume that was carried north-east. The area closest to the accident produced 66 diagnosed cases of chronic radiation syndrome, providing the bulk of the data about this condition.

Windscale fire
The Windscale fire resulted when uranium metal fuel ignited inside plutonium production piles; surrounding dairy farms were contaminated. The severity of the incident was covered up at the time by the UK government, as Prime Minister Harold Macmillan feared that it would harm British nuclear relations with America, and so original reports on the disaster and its health impacts were subject to heavy censorship. The severity of the radioactive fallout was played down, and the release of a highly dangerous isotope during the fire, Polonium-210, was covered up at the time.

Partly because of this, consensus on the precise number of cancer deaths caused in the long term as a result of the radiation leak has changed over time as more information on the incident has come to light. Taking into account the impact of the release of Polonium-210 for the first time, a 1983 UK government report estimated at least 33 cancer fatalities as a result of the incident. An updated 1988 UK government report estimated that 100 fatalities "probably" resulted from cancers as a result of the releases over 40 to 50 years. In 2007, the 50-year anniversary of the fire, new academic research into the health effects of the incident was published by Richard Wakeford, a visiting professor at the University of Manchester's Dalton Nuclear Institute, and by former UK Atomic Energy Authority researcher, John Garland. Their study concluded that because the actual amount of radiation released in the fire could be double the previous estimates, and that the radioactive plume actually travelled further east, there were 100 to 240 cancer fatalities in the long term as a result of the fire.

Fukushima disaster

In a 2013 report, the United Nations Scientific Committee on the Effects of Atomic Radiation (UNSCEAR) stated the overall health risks from the Fukushima disaster to be far lower than those of Chernobyl.  There have been no observed or expected deterministic effects.  In pregnancies, there has been no expected increase in spontaneous abortions, miscarriages, perinatal mortality, birth defects, or cognitive impairment.  Finally, there was no expected discernible increase in heritable disease or discernible radiation-related increases in any cancers, with the possible exception of thyroid cancer.  However, the high detection rates of thyroid nodules, cysts, and cancer may be a consequence of intensive screening.  In a 2015 white paper, UNSCEAR stated its findings from 2013 remain valid and largely unaffected by new information, and the new information further supports the statement that high thyroid detection is likely due to more intensive screening.

As of 2012 none of the workers at the Fukushima Daiichi site had died from acute radiation poisoning, though six workers died due to various reasons, including cardiovascular disease, during the containment efforts or work to stabilize the earthquake and tsunami damage to the site. In 2018 a worker in charge of measuring radiation after the meltdown, who was in his 50s, died from lung cancer; he had been diagnosed in 2016 and his death was attributed to his radiation exposure.

In contrast, an opinion piece in The Wall Street Journal cites a 2013 Japanese study, which concluded that mortality due to "evacuation stress" from the area around Fukushima had reached more than 1600. This includes deaths from suicide and lack of access to critical health care, but not from radiation, increased cancer, or any other direct result of the nuclear accident. The author also states these deaths occurred among people who had been evacuated from areas where the radiation posed little or no risk to their health, areas where they would experience less exposure than the normal amount received by residents in Finland.

There was a class action lawsuit brought by a few sailors from USS Ronald Reagan against Tokyo Electric Power (TEPCO) and GE. They claimed to be suffering severe radiation induced illnesses. Ronald Reagan was part of the operation "Tomodachi" to deliver essential supplies to devastated communities in the wake of the Tsunami on March 11, 2011. This lawsuit was dismissed.

See also
 Lists of nuclear disasters and radioactive incidents

References

External links
The Worst Nuclear Disasters TIME magazine

Accidents by death toll

Lists by death toll
Accidents by death toll